William John Mannion (born 5 May 1998) is an English professional footballer who plays as a goalkeeper for Cambridge United.

Club career 
Mannion joined AFC Wimbledon at the age of 16. He was a key member of the Under-18 team that knocked Premier League academies Watford and Newcastle United out of the FA Youth Cup before a fifth round defeat to Chelsea.

In July 2016, Mannion signed for Premier League club Hull City on a three-year deal. Due to his age, AFC Wimbledon were entitled to a compensation fee settled by a tribunal. In May 2017, it was announced that Hull City would pay an initial fee of £100,000, plus further payments of up to £100,000 for appearances for the first team, and up to £225,000 should he become an Under-21 and full international in a competitive match.

Mannion spent his first season with the club's Under-23 side, and was named on the bench in the EFL Cup in August 2016. On 22 August 2017, he made his debut in a 2–0 EFL Cup defeat at Doncaster Rovers.

Mannion joined Plymouth Argyle on an emergency loan, on the same date of an EFL Trophy game away to Yeovil Town. This game quickly became his debut, the game ended in defeat for Argyle as they went crashing out of the cup 2–1 due to a late goal by Sam Surridge. This turned out to be Mannion's only game for Argyle.

On 9 August 2018, Mannion agreed to join National League side Aldershot Town on loan until January 2019. This was later extended to the end of the 2018–19 season.

On 1 March 2019, Mannion had his contract with Hull City extended by 1 year.

He joined National League North side Kidderminster Harriers on loan on 29 October 2019 until 25 April 2020 and played in 16 games for them.

Following the relegation of Hull City at the end of the 2019–20 season to the EFL League One, Mannion was released by the club.

On 13 August 2020, Mannion joined Cypriot First Division side Pafos on a free transfer.

On 3 August 2021, Mannion signed a one-year deal with Cambridge United.

On 22 October 2021, Mannion joined National League South side Havant & Waterlooville on a one-month loan deal.

International career 
In January 2016, Mannion was invited to train with the England Under-16 squad. He was called up to the England Under-19 squad later that year, and made his international debut in a 1–1 draw with Netherlands Under-19s on 1 September. He made his second appearance a month later in a 2–1 win over Hungary Under-19s.

Career statistics

References

External links
England profile at The Football Association

1998 births
Living people
English footballers
Association football goalkeepers
AFC Wimbledon players
Hull City A.F.C. players
Plymouth Argyle F.C. players
Aldershot Town F.C. players
Kidderminster Harriers F.C. players
Pafos FC players
Cambridge United F.C. players
Havant & Waterlooville F.C. players
English expatriate footballers
English expatriate sportspeople in Cyprus
Expatriate footballers in Cyprus